The Middle English Story of Genesis and Exodus is an anonymous English vernacular poem written around 1250 in Norfolk. In 4162 lines of verse it runs from the creation of the world until the death of Moses. There is a modern critical edition by Arngart. The 19th-century edition by Morris is available on Project Guttenberg.

Text sample
The following passage is interesting for containing the earliest reference to the Firmament of Heaven in the English language.

References

Sources 

 
 
 ; on Project Gutenberg; on Internet Archive.